Monks Eleigh is a village and a civil parish in Babergh, Suffolk, United Kingdom, situated on the tributary to the River Brett in a rural area. The parish contains the hamlets of Swingleton Green and Stackyard Green.

Notable buildings
The parish church, St. Peter, is on the site of a Saxon church and has a 15th-century tower which can be seen from the surrounding countryside. It is a Grade I listed building.
Some houses round the village green on Church Hill date back to the 16th century, as does the Swan Inn.

Monks Eleigh Congregational Chapel, on Brent Eleigh Road, was founded in 1820. It is now a United Reformed Church church. Church books, including the history of the church, minutes, collection accounts, registers and membership roll, for the period 1824 to 1924, are held by the National Archives.

The Fenn is a Grade II* listed Georgian house at Swingleton Green.

Modern buildings include the village hall on Church Green. There is also a community shop and post office next to the Swan Inn on the main Brent Eleigh Road.

Swingleton Green 
Swingleton Green is a hamlet in the civil parish of Monks Eleigh, in the Babergh District, in the county of Suffolk, England. It is located on a minor road called Back Lane which runs just by the A1141 road. Nearby settlements include the villages of Monks Eleigh, Brent Eleigh, Chelsworth and Milden. The A1141 road and the B1115 road run nearby.

Stackyard Green
Stackyard Green is a hamlet in the civil parish of Monks Eleigh, in the Babergh District, in the English county of Suffolk.

References

External links

Monks Eleigh Parish Council
St.Peter, Monks Eleigh
Monks Eleigh in the 19th century
 The Stour from Source to Sea, and tributaries
Monks Eleigh at genuki

Villages in Suffolk
Babergh District
Civil parishes in Suffolk